Irene Karine Dalby (born 31 May 1971 in Stange, Hedmark) is a former international swimmer from Norway, who competed in the late 1980s and early 1990s. She is a three-time Olympian for her native country.

Honours 
 1986: 1 bronze medal (800 m freestyle) at the European Junior Championship
 1989: 1 bronze medal (800 m freestyle) at the European Championships, Silver in the FINA Swimming World Cup (Distance) freestyle)
 1991: 2 gold medal (400 m freestyle and (800 m freestyle in the European Championships
 1993: 1 silver medal (800 m freestyle and 1 bronze medal (400 m freestyle at the European Championships
 1995: 2 bronze medals (400 m freestyle and (800 m freestyle in the European Championships

Personal bests 
When Dalby retired as swimmer she sat this personal bests in short course:
 57.13 on 100 m freestyle
 2:00.44 on 200 m freestyle
 4:07.88 on 400 m freestyle
 8:26.81 on 800 m freestyle

References
 

1971 births
Living people
People from Stange
Sportspeople from Hamar
Norwegian female freestyle swimmers
Olympic swimmers of Norway
Swimmers at the 1988 Summer Olympics
Swimmers at the 1992 Summer Olympics
Swimmers at the 1996 Summer Olympics
European Aquatics Championships medalists in swimming
20th-century Norwegian women